Inmirania is a thermophilic and facultatively autotrophic genus of bacteria from the family of Ectothiorhodospiraceae with one known species (Inmirania thermothiophila). Inmirania thermothiophila has been isolated from water and sediments from a thermal spring from the Kuril Islands.

References

Chromatiales
Bacteria genera
Monotypic bacteria genera
Taxa described in 2016